"The Moon of Manakoora" is a popular song written by Frank Loesser (lyrics) and Alfred Newman (music) for the 1937 Paramount film The Hurricane starring Dorothy Lamour. Lamour sang the song in the film and also made a commercial recording of it.
The song "The Moon of Manakoora" is considered a standard and was Loesser's first success as a lyric writer.

Manakoora, loosely translated to English, is "witchcraft", derived from "mana" meaning "magic" and "koora/kura" (pronounced "KUU-rah") meaning "lore" or "school" or "body of knowledge".

Other recordings 

The song has been covered by many other artists, including:

 The cast of TV series Glee
 Australian Jazz vocalist Janet Seidel
 The Norman Luboff Choir
 Andy Williams (for his 1959 album To You Sweetheart, Aloha.)
 The Ames Brothers
 Chet Atkins
 Stanley Black 
 Frankie Carle
 Benny Carter
 Frank Chacksfield
 Bing Crosby - The Crosby version was recorded on January 21, 1938 with John Scott Trotter and his Orchestra for Decca Records and reached the No. 10 position in the charts in 1938.
 Vic Damone (for his 1962 album Strange Enchantment)
 Eddie "Lockjaw" Davis
 Percy Faith
 Benny Goodman
 Burl Ives (for his 1965 album On the Beach at Waikiki)
 Harry James
 Kana King
 Andre Kostelanetz
 Gene Krupa
 Harry Leader
 Guy Lombardo 
 Arthur Lyman
 Henry Mancini
 Tony Martin (with Ray Noble and his Orchestra. This recording reached the charts of the day and peaked in the No. 15 position.)
 Felix Mendelssohn’s Hawaiian Serenaders
 Buddy Merrill Orchestra
 Vaughn Monroe
 Alfred Newman
 Les Paul and Mary Ford
 Sonny Rollins
 Wayne Shorter
 The Ventures

The melody of the song appears in themes for the movies The Hurricane and Mr. Robinson Crusoe.

References
 

1937 songs
Songs written for films
Songs written by Frank Loesser